The Brothers (Cantonese: 差人大佬搏命仔 Cha yan daai liu bok meng chai, Mandarin: Cha ren da lao bo ming zai) is a 1979 Hong Kong action crime-drama film directed by Hua Shan, written by Lam Chin Wai and Yuen Cheung, and produced by Runme Shaw under the Shaw Brothers Studio. The film stars Tony Liu, Danny Lee Sau-Yin, Chau Li Chuan, Ku Feng, and Nam Hung. It is a remake of Indian action crime-drama film Deewaar (1975), written by Salim–Javed. In turn, The Brothers inspired John Woo's A Better Tomorrow and played a key role in the creation of the heroic bloodshed crime genre of 1980s Hong Kong action cinema.

Plot
Hong Kong Cinemagic provides the following plot summary.

Cast 
The following are the film's main cast members.

Tony Liu (Lau Wing) as Zhang Zhigang
Danny Lee Sau-Yin as Inspector Zhang Zhiqiang
Chow Lai-Kuen as Yanfen
Ku Feng as Boss Qian Laosan
Nam Hung as Mother Zhang
Chiang Tao as Zhou Hei / Blackie
Ricky Wong Chung-Tsu as Young Zhigang
Harada Riki as Father Zhang
Chan Shen as Boss Huang Shou Ren
Alan Chan Kwok-Kuen as Huang's assistant
Wang Han-Chen as Dock worker
Yang Chi-Ching as Police chief
Wong Ching-Ho as Mr. Wang
Hung Ling-Ling as Mrs. Wang

Production
The Brothers is a remake of Deewaar (The Wall), a 1975 Indian crime film. Written by Salim–Javed (Salim Khan and Javed Akhtar) and directed by Yash Chopra, the story was loosely inspired by the Bombay underworld gangster Haji Mastan. The original film stars Bollywood superstar Amitabh Bachchan (as the criminal brother played by Tony Liu), Shashi Kapoor (as the cop brother played by Danny Lee), Nirupa Roy (as the mother played by Nam Hung) and Iftekhar (in the role played by Ku Feng). The Brothers is a mostly faithful remake, with many of the same scenes, as well as dialogues transcribed directly from the original in many places.

There are some notable differences. It has a shorter 90-minute length, compared to the original's 176 minutes. Other changes reflect the shift from Indian culture to Chinese culture, such as the setting changed from Bombay to Hong Kong, and the Bombay underworld changed to the Chinese triads. There are also cultural references changed to reflect Chinese culture; for example, the number on the criminal brother's badge is changed from 786, a number with symbolic significance in Islam, to 838, which signifies the Chinese Year of the Horse.

Legacy
The Brothers played a key role in the creation of the heroic bloodshed crime genre of 1980s Hong Kong action cinema. Plot elements of The Brothers was reimagined for John Woo's internationally acclaimed breakthrough A Better Tomorrow (1986), which involved a similar conflict between two brothers on opposing sides of the law. In particular, Ti Lung's character in A Better Tomorrow is similar to Tony Liu's character in The Brothers (in turn based on Amitabh Bachchan's character in Deewaar). In turn, A Better Tomorrow was a landmark film, credited with creating the heroic bloodshed genre, which was influential in Hong Kong action cinema, and later Hollywood. The Brothers also established Danny Lee (playing Sashi Kapoor's character from Deewaar) with a police officer persona later seen in Hong Kong crime films such as Woo's The Killer (1989).

References

External links
 

1970s crime drama films
1979 films
1970s Cantonese-language films
Hong Kong action films
Hong Kong crime drama films
Films about brothers
Films set in Hong Kong
Remakes of Hong Kong films
Films with screenplays by Salim–Javed
Triad films
1979 drama films
1970s Hong Kong films